Koupia is a dubious extinct genus of non-mammalian synapsid. The type species, K. koupensis, was coined by Lieuwe Dirk Boonstra in 1948, with a well-preserved skull from the Tapinocephalus Assemblage Zone of South Africa, SAM-PK-11796, designated the holotype. This specimen has since been lost, and K. koupensis is currently considered a nomen dubium or a possible junior synonym of Brachyprosopus broomi.

References

Dicynodonts
Permian synapsids of Africa
Fossil taxa described in 1948
Taxa named by Lieuwe Dirk Boonstra
Anomodont genera